Bathurst West-Beresford is a provincial electoral district for the Legislative Assembly of New Brunswick, Canada.  It was contested in the 2014 general election, having been created in the 2013 redistribution of electoral boundaries from portions of the Bathurst and Nigadoo-Chaleur electoral districts.

It includes the city of Bathurst west of the Middle River, the town of Beresford and rural communities south of the Tetagouche River.

Members of the Legislative Assembly

Election results

References 

Website of the Legislative Assembly of New Brunswick
Map of riding as of 2018

New Brunswick provincial electoral districts
Politics of Bathurst, New Brunswick